Život sa stricem (My Uncle's Legacy) is a 1988 Yugoslavian drama film directed by Krsto Papić, starring Davor Janjić, Alma Prica, Miodrag Krivokapić, Branislav Lečić, Anica Dobra and Ivo Gregurević. It is based on Okvir za mržnju, a novel by Ivan Aralica.

Plot

Overview

"In the story, Martin is a schoolboy with a sense of the absurd and a willingness to use ridicule to amuse himself and his classmates. He has an uncle who is high up in the nation’s bureaucracy who protects him and his grandfather now that his father has died. His grandfather is too stubborn to give his farm to the local farming collective, and Martin himself is in hot water with the principal for making fun of his girlfriend, one of the students at the high school. However, as long as the uncle is able to protect them, they remain out of hot water."

Cast

Awards 
The film won the Golden Arena for Best Film at the 1988 Pula Festival of Yugoslav Film, along with the Golden Gate of Pula Audience Award, and was later nominated for the 1990 Golden Globe Award for Best Foreign Language Film. The film was also selected as the Yugoslav entry for the Best Foreign Language Film at the 61st Academy Awards, but was not accepted as a nominee.

See also
 List of submissions to the 61st Academy Awards for Best Foreign Language Film
 List of Yugoslav submissions for the Academy Award for Best Foreign Language Film

References

External links 
 

1988 films
1988 drama films
Serbo-Croatian-language films
Films directed by Krsto Papić
Films shot in Croatia
Films based on Croatian novels
Croatian drama films
Films set in 1951
Yugoslav drama films